The Sochi agreement (also known as the Dagomys Agreements, official name in Russian: «Cоглашение о принципах мирного урегулирования грузино-осетинского конфликта») was a ceasefire agreement ostensibly marking the end of both the Georgian–Ossetian and Georgian–Abkhazian conflicts, signed in Sochi on June 24, 1992 between Georgia and Russia, the ceasefire with Abkhazia on July 27, 1993.

South Ossetia agreement 

Russia brokered a ceasefire and negotiated the Agreement in 1992. The agreement primarily established a cease-fire between both the Georgian and South Ossetian forces, but it also defined a zone of conflict around the South Ossetian capital of Tskhinvali and established a security corridor along the border of the as yet unrecognized South Ossetian territories. The Agreement also created a Joint Control Commission and a peacekeeping body, the Joint Peacekeeping Forces group (JPKF). The JPKF was put under Russian command and was composed of peacekeepers from Georgia, Russia, and North Ossetia (as the separatist South Ossetian government was still unrecognized; South Ossetian peacekeepers, however, served in the North Ossetian contingent). In addition, the Organization for Security and Cooperation in Europe (OSCE) did agree to monitor the ceasefire and to facilitate negotiations. The OSCE sought to eliminate sources of tension, support the existing ceasefire, and facilitate a broader political framework to alleviate long term disharmony.

Abkhazia agreement 

Once again, a Russian brokered agreement in 1993, the Agreement on a ceasefire in Abkhazia and On a Mechanism To Ensure Its Observance, allowed for a moratorium on the use of force, the withdrawal of conflicting parties from the warzone within fifteen days, establishing a Russian-Georgian-Abkhaz control group to monitor the ceasefire, the return of the Abkhazian parliament to Sukhumi, the placement of UN observers in the territory, and the resumption of talks to settle the dispute. In August of the same year UNOMIG was put in place as the UN monitoring force. The truce was violated on September 27 as Abkhaz forces seized Sukhumi and declared victory. The pro-Georgian forces then withdrew to Tbilisi, as Georgia joined the CIS and changed Russia's stance towards Georgia's on the matter.

A further Agreement on a Cease-fire and Separation of Forces, also known as the 1994 Moscow Agreement, was agreed the following year.

Once again, on March 6–7, 2003, Georgian President Eduard Sheverdnadze and Russian President Vladimir Putin signed another agreement that sought to include economic rehabilitation, resumption of rail networks, and the attraction of international investment. This would happen to turn into a disappointment, especially for the Georgians.

Other Sochi summits 

In 2003, Russian President Vladimir Putin met Georgian President Shevardnadze and Abkhazian PM Gennady Gagulia and set in motion a Sochi process that sought to create a Georgian-Russian-Abkhaz working groups on confidence building measures's (CBM). The parties sought to make it easier for the return of refugees and economic reconstruction. The Sochi process signified a regress from the multilateral to a bilateral format that left Georgia on its own to face Russia and the Abkhaz. It also was seen to undermine Georgia's argument that the Geneva process was the sole format for a comprehensive settlement of the conflict. In 2004, Russia were seen to violate the agreement as a Russian company begun maintenance work on the Sochi-Sukhumi railroad, which was legally Georgian, though controlled by Russia and the Abkhaz. The move was seen as a violation whereby restoration could only proceed in parallel with the safe return of Georgian refugees to Abkhazia beginning with the Gali district. However, there had been no progress on the return of refugees, and so, unilateral Russian actions on the railroad violated the Sochi agreement.  However, there had been no progress on the return of refugees.

In 2008, U.S. President George W. Bush and Putin made a last-ditch attempt as incumbent presidents to resolve a protracted dispute over European missile defenses at another Sochi summit. This followed Russian officials objecting to U.S. plans to deploy ballistic missile defenses (BMD) in Poland and the Czech Republic. They had claim that the stated American justification for the BMD deployments—that the systems are needed to defend the United States and European countries against an emerging Iranian missile threat—lacked credibility. Instead, they insisted the true objective of such moves along Russia's periphery was to weaken Russia's nuclear deterrent.

See also
 Russian–Turkish memorandum, about the 2019 Turkish offensive into Syria

References

External links 
 Text of the agreement
Text of the Agreement in English
Text of all peace accords for Georgia

Georgia (country)–Russia relations
Peace treaties
Abkhazia–Russia relations
Russia–South Ossetia relations
Treaties of Georgia (country)
Treaties concluded in 1992
Treaties concluded in 1993
Treaties of South Ossetia
Treaties of Abkhazia
Ceasefires